CP Lim (Chiok-Ping Lim) is an academic born in Malaysia.

In his earlier years, he specialised in art and design. Between 1987 and 1999, he served as the Dean in the School of Design, Nanyang Academy of Fine Arts (Singapore). In the early 1970s, CP Lim became interested in oriental culture and astrology. CP Lim is an Associate Professor with the International Institute of Tao Philosophy (Taiwan) and Yunnan University (China) since 2004. He has had several titles published internationally.

Publications
 Feng Shui Story 4 – The Art of Chinese name (2011) In Production
 Feng Shui Story 3 – Predictions (2011) In Production
 Feng Shui Story 2 – Practical Feng Shui in Modern Environment (2009) - 
 Feng Shui Story 1 – Xuan Kong Flying Star Feng Shui (2009) - 
 Secrets of the Human Face & Palm (2007) - 
 The Science of Feng Shui (English) (2002) - 
 I-Ching, Feng Shui & Fate (2000) - 
 Auspicious Dates and Feng Shui (1998) -

References

External links
 Official website

Academic staff of Nanyang Academy of Fine Arts
Living people
Malaysian academics
Academic staff of Yunnan University
Year of birth missing (living people)